Arivaca Creek is a small valley stream in southern Pima County, Arizona, that is approximately  long from its origin in Arivaca Valley to its confluence with the Brawley Wash stream system. As a seasonal stream, Arivaca Creek is perennial for only about two miles most years and experiences its greatest stream-flow during winter and the summer Monsoon season.

Most of Arivaca Creek and the riparian corridor it supports is protected as part of the Buenos Aires National Wildlife Refuge (Buenos Aires NWR). A rare swamp-like desert wetland area called Arivaca Cienega is located in the upper reaches of the creek and makes up the easternmost part of the Buenos Aires NWR. Both areas are open to the public for hiking, bird watching and other outdoor recreational activities. The small community of Arivaca, Arizona, is located along the banks of the creek, in between the Arivaca Cienega just east of town and the Arivaca Creek trailhead to the west.

See also

 List of Arizona rivers

References

Rivers of Pima County, Arizona
Rivers of Arizona
Birdwatching sites in the United States
Protected areas of Pima County, Arizona
Protected areas of the Sonoran Desert